Vibeke L. Johansen (born 27 July 1978) is an Olympic and National Record holding swimmer from Norway. She swam for Norway at the 1996 Summer Olympics.

She competed at the European Short Course Swimming Championships 1996, where she won a bronze medal in 50 m freestyle.

She participated at the 1996 Summer Olympics, where she finished 17th in 50 m freestyle, and 18th in 100 m freestyle.

References

External links

1978 births
Living people
Olympic swimmers of Norway
Swimmers at the 1996 Summer Olympics
Norwegian female freestyle swimmers
20th-century Norwegian women